Geoffrey Curran may refer to:

 Geoffrey Curran (equestrian) (born 1980), Irish equestrian
 Geoffrey Curran (cyclist) (born 1995), American cyclist